Wilsill is a village in Nidderdale in the Harrogate district of North Yorkshire, England. In 2016, Harrogate Borough Council estimated the population as being 176.

The village appears in the Domesday Book as Wifelshale, where it was listed as having 18 villagers, 40 ploughlands and belonging to the Archbishop of York. The name of the village derives from a personal name (Wifel) and the Old English Halh, which means corner of land.

The village has a Methodist chapel, an Anglican church (St Michael and All Angels) and a public house (The Birch Tree Inn). The village is served by an eight times daily bus service between Pateley Bridge and Harrogate. Although the railway between Harrogate and Pateley Bridge went through the southern part of the villages' location, it was not furnished with a railway station.

References

External links

Villages in North Yorkshire
Nidderdale